The Royal Saint Helena Police Service, formerly the Saint Helena Police Service,  is the local police force for the British overseas territory of Saint Helena, Ascension and Tristan da Cunha, consisting of the South Atlantic islands of Saint Helena, Ascension and the island group of Tristan da Cunha.

The Royal Saint Helena Police Service is part of the Safety, Security and Home Affairs Portfolio which also includes the Fire and Rescue Service, His Majesty's Prison Jamestown, the Immigration Office and the Sea Rescue Service.

Staffing and resources
The service has 29 attested police officers: a chief of police, a detective chief inspector, three inspectors, a detective sergeant, four sergeants, three detective constables and sixteen constables. Including civilians, it has a total staff of 63 on the most populous island of St Helena, with a detachment of five on Ascension Island led by an inspector. Policing on Tristan da Cunha is undertaken by one full-time police inspector and three special constables. The current Tristan da Cunha inspector is Inspector Conrad Glass.

Saint Helena has one police station, Coleman House, named after PC Leonard John Coleman who died in the line of duty on 2 December 1982. The Island's only prison - HMP Jamestown - was built in 1827 and refurbished in 2018.

The RSHP has a joint partnership with Hampshire and Isle of Wight Constabulary in the United Kingdom.

Constables
Officers of the RSHPS are known as constables, as is typical with British police organisations. The constables are a mixture of UK, South African and local nationals. They do receive a certain amount of uniforms and equipment from the UK. In 2014, they received some uniform from Sussex Police in the United Kingdom.

Officer deaths on duty
PC Leonard John Coleman was killed while attending a domestic incident on 2 December 1982.

HMP Jamestown
Established in 1826 HMP Jamestown provides accommodation for convicted and remanded prisoners and also provides a police custody facility for arrested persons. HMP Jamestown is a Category B prison holding adult male and female prisoners and young offenders, both convicted and those currently on remand by the courts.

While prison services on St. Helena adhere to the same high standards as other facilities in the UK, HMP Jamestown cannot fulfill this requirements in some aspects, mainly due to the old building offering only limited space. It was criticised that the building did not offer modern (or hardly any at all) fire protection and is not barrier-free, making access for visiting wheelchair users impossible. The cells are overcrowded, not properly ventilated and do not allow sunlight to reach the inmates. There are no sanitation facilities in the cells and prisoners have to use common facilities that are not up to modern standards.

These problems are well known as HMP Jamestown had been declared unfit for further use already in 1850. Since that time, many suggestions had been made to build a more suitable prison and relocate the old facility, the last plan was for doing so in 2017. However, none of these plans have been followed up properly and today the same facilities, that have been declared unsuitable in 1850, are still being used in a rather improvised way. Recent structural updates to improve the prisons fire safety might indicate that the relocation of the prison is still not planned in the near future.

The prison was widely condemned and deemed to be "unfit for purpose" following an Inquiry by The Equality & Human Rights Commission.

Immigration office 
This is the Office in charge of all border control at the Sea & Air Port, passport issuing and nationality matters and is composed of:

Chief Immigration Officer
Three Senior Immigration Officers
Four Immigration Officers

See also
 Saint Helena Supreme Court
St Helena Magistrates' Court

References

Sources
 World Police Encyclopedia, ed. by Dilip K. Das & Michael Palmiotto published by Taylor & Francis, 2004.
 World Encyclopedia of Police Forces and Correctional Systems, second edition, Gale, 2006.
 Sullivan, Larry E. Encyclopedia of Law Enforcement. Thousand Oaks: SAGE Publications, 2005.

External links
 Royal Saint Helena Police Service
 Ascension Island Detachment

Police forces of British Overseas Territories and Crown Dependencies
Organisations based in Saint Helena
Ascension Island
Tristan da Cunha